Asko Mäkilä (20 August 1944 – 2 February 2012) was a Finnish footballer. He played in four matches for the Finland national football team from 1965 to 1966.

References

1944 births
2012 deaths
Finnish footballers
Finland international footballers
Place of birth missing
Association footballers not categorized by position